FIMA Basketball or (Fizkulturayi instituti marzakan akumb basketbol), meaning Physical-culture Institute Sports Club Basketball, are the professional basketball section of FIMA Yerevan, the sports club that represents the Armenian State Institute of Physical Culture and Sport.

History
Despite a financial crisis in the club, the basketball section joined the Armenia Basketball League A as one of its seven founders.

After finishing in the third place at the end of the regular season of the league's inaugural season, FIMA advanced to the semifinals of the competition.

Season by season

Administration and technical staff

References

External links
FIMA Basketball Facebook account

Basketball teams in Armenia
FIMA Yerevan